Lucian Dan Turcu (born 3 October 1986) is a former Romanian footballer who played as a left back .

References

Sportspeople from Cluj-Napoca
Living people
1986 births
Romanian footballers
Association football defenders
FC Universitatea Cluj players
FC Sportul Studențesc București players
FC CFR Timișoara players
ACF Gloria Bistrița players
ASA 2013 Târgu Mureș players
AFC Săgeata Năvodari players
FC Viitorul Constanța players
Liga I players
Liga II players
Liga III players